Chhabilal Bishwakarma is a Nepali politician and a member of the House of Representatives of the federal parliament of Nepal. He was elected under the first-past-the-post system from Rupandehi-1 constituency, as a member of CPN UML and a joint candidate of the left alliance.

In April 2007, he became one of the first two Nepali Dalits to become full minister in the Nepali government. He was a member of CPN UML at the time.

Following the formation of Nepal Communist Party (NCP), he was elected to the Standing Committee of the party.

References

Living people
Place of birth missing (living people)
Nepal MPs 2017–2022
Nepal Communist Party (NCP) politicians
Khas people
Communist Party of Nepal (Unified Marxist–Leninist) politicians
1962 births
Nepal MPs 2022–present
Members of the 1st Nepalese Constituent Assembly